Antonio Vela Cobo (1629-1675) was a Spanish Baroque painter, sculptor and gilder.

Cobo was the son of the painter and gilder Cristóbal Vela. He primarily produced religious-themed works on commission for various churches and convents in and around Córdoba, Andalusia. After his father's death in 1654, Cobo took over his father's workshop and continued working until his death in 1675.

References
 Lopez Molina, Manuel, "Painters Giennenses of the first half of the seventeenth century ', Bulletin of the Institute of Giennenses, t. II, No. 172 (1999), p. 921-946.
 Pérez Sánchez, Alfonso E. (1992). Baroque Painting in Spain 1600–1750. Madrid: Ediciones Chair. .
 Raya Raya, Maria Angeles (1986). Cordoba and religious painting (XIV-XVIII). Cordoba: Pawnshop Publications and Savings Bank of Córdoba. .

1629 births
1675 deaths
17th-century Spanish painters
Spanish male painters
Spanish Baroque painters